Aerus, legally Aerotransportes Rafilher S.A. de C.V., is a planned Mexican regional carrier founded in 2022, and is expected to start operations in March 2023. It will be based in Monterrey International Airport.

History
Aerus was founded in May 2022 by Grupo Herrera, following local government approval. It was originally founded in 1990 in San Luis Potosi as Aerotransportes Rafilher, for air taxi services.

The airline is planned to launch in the first quarter of 2023, seeking to operate flights to destinations with no current air service.

In January 2023, the airline ordered 30 all-electric Eviation Alice aircraft.

In February 2023, reports indicated that Aerus is planning to expand operations, aiming to have 14 aircraft and 500 employees by 2025. The airline is planning an investment of US$98 million as part of the expansion effort. The airline is also planning to recruit former employees of Aeromar, an airline that closed operations earlier in the month.

Destinations
The airline plans to operate both domestic and international flights in the northeatern region, using Textron Aviation-built Cessna aircraft. While there's no confirmed information about its exact destinations, the airline is planning service to Piedras Negras and Monclova, the Tamaulipas, Coahuila, and Veracruz states, as well as service to the United States.

The first confirmed route from Tampico to Monterrey will start in April.

Fleet

References

Airlines established in 1990
Airlines established in 2022
Airlines of Mexico
Mexican companies established in 2022
Regional airlines of Mexico